Edge or EDGE may refer to:

Technology

Computing
 Edge computing, a network load-balancing system
 Edge device, an entry point to a computer network
 Adobe Edge, a graphical development application
 Microsoft Edge, a web browser developed by Microsoft
 EdgeHTML, the layout engine previously used in Microsoft Edge
 ThinkPad Edge, a Lenovo laptop computer series marketed from 2010
 Silhouette edge, in computer graphics, a feature of a 3D body projected onto a 2D plane
 Explicit data graph execution, a computer instruction set architecture

Telecommunication(s)
 Edge Wireless, an American mobile phone provider
 Enhanced Data rates for GSM Evolution, a pre-3G digital mobile phone technology
 Motorola Edge, a series of smartphones made by Motorola
 Samsung Galaxy Note Edge, a phablet made by Samsung
 Samsung Galaxy S7 Edge or Samsung Galaxy S6 Edge, smartphones made by Samsung
 Ubuntu Edge, a prototype smartphone made by Canonical

Entertainment

Music
 Edge (Daryl Braithwaite album), a 1988 album by Daryl Braithwaite
 "Edge", the B-side of the 2008 single "Love the World" by Perfume
 "Edge", a 2013 song by Haim from Days Are Gone

Radio and television
 The Edge 102.1 in Toronto, Canada
 CADA, formerly The Edge 96.ONE in Katoomba, New South Wales
 93.7 Edge FM, in Bega, New South Wales
 Edge FM 102.1, in Wangaratta, Victoria
 Edge FM 102.5, in Deniliquin, New South Wales
 Edge Radio, in Hobart, Tasmania
 Edge TV, a Canadian cable music channel

Video games
 Edge (magazine), a UK video games magazine
 Edge (video game), a 2008 video game by Mobigame
 Edge Games, an American video game company
 Edge (Final Fantasy), a character from the game Final Fantasy IV
 Edge (Rival Schools), a character from the game Rival Schools
 Edge (Suikoden), a character from the game Suikoden III

Organizations
 Edge (educational foundation), an organization in the United Kingdom
 Edge Church, an assemblies of God megachurch in Adelaide, South Australia
 EDGE Foundation, an organization helping female students pursue graduate studies in mathematics
 Edge Foundation, Inc., a science and technology think tank
 EDGE Group, an advanced military and technology conglomerate based in the United Arab Emirates

People

Surname
 Edge (surname)

Other
 The Edge (born 1961 as David Howell Evans), guitarist for rock band U2
 Morgan Edge, a DC Comics supervillain
 Edge (wrestler) (born 1973), ring name of Canadian professional wrestler Adam Copeland
 Edgerrin James (born 1978), nicknamed "Edge", American football player

Places
 Edge, Cheshire, a former civil parish
 Edge, Gloucestershire, a village north of Stroud
 Edge, Shropshire, a hamlet near Yockleton
 Edge, Texas, a community in the United States
 Edge House, a historic home in Groveland, Florida, U.S.
 The Edge (New York), an observation deck in New York City's Hudson Yards development

Sports
 Edge (cricket), a term used in cricket
 Edge rusher, either a defensive end or outside linebacker, positions in American football 
 St. John's Edge, a Canadian basketball team
 West Michigan Edge, an American soccer team

Other
 Edge (geometry), a one-dimensional line segment joining two vertices
 Edge (graph theory), a pair of vertices that are adjacent in a graph
 Edge (shaving gel), a brand of shaving gel
 Edge Act, U.S. banking legislation
 Edge baronets, title in the Baronetage of the United Kingdom
 EDGE species, evolutionarily distinct and globally endangered species
 Ford Edge, a midsize crossover SUV
 Leading edge, a line connecting the forward-most points of a wing's profile
 Trailing edge, the rear edge of the wing
 Signal edge, a transition of a digital signal from low to high or high to low
 Zivko Edge 540, an aerobatic aircraft

See also 
 
 
 The Edge (disambiguation)
 Edging (disambiguation)
 102.1 The Edge (disambiguation)
 Cutting edge (disambiguation)
 Leading edge (disambiguation)
 On the Edge (disambiguation)
 Over the Edge (disambiguation)